Jurerê is a beach-side neighbourhood on the northern shore of the island of Florianópolis in Santa Catarina, Brazil. The Jurerê Internacional resort is located in Jurerê.

References

Neighbourhoods in Florianópolis
Beaches of Florianópolis